= Charles-Louis d'Authville Des Amourettes =

French soldier (1716–1762)

Charles-Louis d'Authville Des Amourettes (1716–1762) was an 18th-century French soldier.

He wrote articles on the art of war for the Encyclopédie by Diderot and D'Alembert.

== Works ==
- 1756: Essai sur la cavalerie tant ancienne que moderne auquel on a joint les instructions & les ordonnances nouvelles qui y ont rapport, avec l'état actuel des troupes à cheval, leur paye, &c., à Paris, chez Charles-Antoine Jombert, imprimeur-libraire du Corps royal de l'artillerie & du génie, rue Dauphine, à l'Image de Notre-Dame.
- 1762: L'Antilégionaire françois, ou le Conservateur des constitutions de l'infanterie, Wésel.
- 1756: Nicolas Deschamps (sieur des Landes, officier, précepteur du duc de Bourbon), Mémoires des deux dernières campagnes de M. de Turenne en Allemagne (...), nouvelle édition revue et corrigée par M. d'Authville Des Amourettes, N. Wilmer.
